The Béavogui government is the current formation of the Cabinet of Guinea. It was formed on 27 October 2021 by Prime Minister of Guinea Mohamed Béavogui.

On 16 July 2022, Bernard Gomou took over as Prime Minister.

Ministers 

 Aboubacar Sidiki Camara - Minister of Defence
 Mamadou Pathé Diallo - Minister for Public Health
 Diaka Sidibé - Minister of Higher Education, Scientific Research and Innovation

References 

Government of Guinea
Beavogui
2021 establishments in Africa
Cabinets established in 2021
Cabinets of Guinea